Al-jarima (الجريمة "The Crime") is a 1973 collection of short stories and a short play by Naguib Mahfouz. The collection contains both crime and absurdist stories.

References

Novels by Naguib Mahfouz
1973 short story collections
Crime short story collections